Great Neck is a village in the town of North Hempstead in Nassau County, on the North Shore of Long Island, in New York, United States. The population was 9,989 at the 2010 census.

The term Great Neck is also commonly applied to the entire peninsula on the north shore and an area extending south to and including Lake Success. The larger Great Neck area comprises a residential community of some 40,000 people made up of nine villages as well as hamlets of North Hempstead, and to distinguish the Village of Great Neck from the other villages in the Greater Great Neck area, it is sometimes referred to as "the old village".

History 
The Village of Great Neck incorporated as a village in 1922.

On August 9, 2022, Great Neck Village Hall was struck by lightning, which led to a fire breaking out and causing severe damage to parts of the building. Shortly afterwards, the Village announced its intentions to restore the structure, which was originally constructed in 1833.

Geography

Demographics

As of the census of 2000, there were 9,538 people, 3,346 households, and 2,552 families residing in the village. The population density was 7,062.3 people per square mile (2,727.9/km2). There were 3,441 housing units at an average density of 2,547.9/sq mi (984.1/km2). The racial makeup of the village was 85.33% White, 2.82% African American, 0.10% Native American, 4.94% Asian, 0.04% Pacific Islander, 3.28% from other races, and 3.48% from two or more races. Hispanic or Latino of any race were 9.17% of the population.

As of 2000 the Village of Great Neck was the second most Iranian place in the United States with 21.1% of its population reporting Iranian ancestry.

There were 3,346 households, out of which 36.6% had children under the age of 18 living with them, 63.9% were married couples living together, 8.8% had a female householder with no husband present, and 23.7% were non-families. 20.9% of all households were made up of individuals, and 12.2% had someone living alone who was 65 years of age or older. The average household size was 2.85 and the average family size was 3.30.

In the village, the population was spread out, with 26.4% under the age of 18, 6.0% from 18 to 24, 25.3% from 25 to 44, 24.7% from 45 to 64, and 17.5% who were 65 years of age or older. The median age was 40 years. For every 100 females, there were 94.2 males. For every 100 females age 18 and over, there were 90.0 males.

The median income for a household in the village was $76,645, and the median income for a family was $89,733. Males had a median income of $52,445 versus $37,476 for females. The per capita income for the village was $38,790. About 5.5% of families and 7.8% of the population were below the poverty line, including 9.5% of those under age 18 and 8.1% of those age 65 or over.

Government

Village government 
As of August 2022, the Mayor of Great Neck is Pedram Bral, the Deputy Mayor is Barton Sobel, and the Village Trustees are Steven Hope, Eli Kashi, and Anne Mendelson.

Representation in higher government

Town representation 
The Village of Great Neck is located in the Town of North Hempstead's 4th council district, which as of August 2022 is represented on the North Hempstead Town Council by Veronica Lurvey (D–Great Neck).

Nassau County representation 
The Village of Great Neck is located in Nassau County's 10th Legislative district, which as of August 2022 is represented in the Nassau County Legislature by Mazi Melesa Pilip (R–Great Neck).

New York State representation

New York State Assembly 
The Village of Great Neck is located in the New York State Assembly's 16th Assembly district, which as of August 2022 is represented by Gina Sillitti (D–Manorhaven).

New York State Senate 
The Village of Great Neck is located in the New York State Senate's 7th State Senate district, which as of August 2022 is represented in the New York State Senate by Anna Kaplan (D–North Hills).

Federal representation

United States Congress 
The Village of Great Neck is located in New York's 3rd congressional district, which as of August 2022 is represented in the United States Congress by Tom Suozzi (D–Glen Cove).

United States Senate 
Like the rest of New York, the Village of Great Neck is represented in the United States Senate by Charles Schumer (D) and Kirsten Gillibrand (D).

Politics 
In the 2020 U.S. presidential election, the majority of Great Neck voters voted for Donald Trump (R).

Education

School district 
The Village of Great Neck is located entirely within the boundaries of (and is thus served by) the Great Neck Union Free School District. As such, all children who reside within the village and attend public schools go to Great Neck's schools.

Additionally, John L. Miller Great Neck North High School and the Village School are located within the village, and Great Neck North Middle School is located on the Incorporated Village of Great Neck's border, with the Incorporated Village of Kings Point.

Library district 
The Village of Great Neck is located wholly within the boundaries of (and is thus served by) the Great Neck Library District.

Infrastructure

Transportation

Road 
Major roadways in the Village of Great Neck include Arrandale Avenue, Baker Hill Road, Beach Road, East Shore Road, Fairview Avenue, Hicks Lane, Middle Neck Road, Old Mill Road, Polo Road, Station Road, and Steamboat Road.

Rail 
No rail lines run through the Village of Great Neck. The nearest Long Island Rail Road station to the village is Great Neck on the Port Washington Branch.

Bus 
The Village of Great Neck is served by the n57 and n58 bus routes, which are operated by Nassau Inter-County Express.

Utilities

Natural gas 
National Grid USA provides natural gas to homes and businesses that are hooked up to natural gas lines in the Village of Great Neck.

Power 
PSEG Long Island provides power to all homes and businesses within the Village of Great Neck.

Sewage 
The Village of Great Neck is connected to (and is thus served by) the Great Neck Water Pollution Control District's sanitary sewer network.

Water 
The Village of Great Neck is located within the boundaries of the Water Authority of Great Neck North, which provides the entirety of the village with water.

Sister city 

The Village of Great Neck is twinned with the following cities:
 Tiberias, Israel (2002)
Ein Qiniyye, Golan Heights (2022)

References

External links

 Official website

Great Neck Peninsula
Iranian-American culture in New York (state)
Town of North Hempstead, New York
Villages in New York (state)
Populated coastal places in New York (state)
 Populated places established in 1644